Aharon Kotler (1892–1962) was an Orthodox Jewish rabbi and a prominent leader of Orthodox Judaism in Lithuania and the United States; the latter being where he founded Beth Medrash Govoha in Lakewood Township, New Jersey.

Early life 
Kotler was born Aharon Pines in Śvisłač, Russian Empire (historically Lithuania, now Belarus) in 1892. He was orphaned at the age of 10 and adopted by his uncle, Yitzchak Pines, a rabbinic judge in Minsk. He studied in the Slabodka yeshiva in Lithuania under
Nosson Tzvi Finkel, and Moshe Mordechai Epstein. Subsequently, he joined his father-in-law, Isser Zalman Meltzer, to run the yeshiva of Slutsk.

World War II and move to the United States 
After World War I, the yeshivah moved from Slutsk to Kletsk in Belarus. With the outbreak of World War II, Kotler and the yeshivah relocated to Vilna, then the major refuge of most yeshivoth from the occupied areas. The smaller Yeshivos followed the lead of the larger Yeshivos, and either escaped with them to Japan and China, or were arrested by the communists and sent to Siberia or Kazakhstan. Most of his students did not manage to escape and were murdered by the Nazis. He was brought to America on April 10, 1941 by the Vaad Hatzalah rescue organization, and guided it during The Holocaust. At first, he settled in New York City's Upper West Side, and in 1949, he moved to the Borough Park neighborhood of Brooklyn.

In 1943, Kotler founded Beth Medrash Govoha in Lakewood Township, New Jersey, with 15 students. By the time of his death in 1962, the yeshiva had grown to 250 students. He was succeeded by his son, Rabbi Shneur Kotler, as rosh yeshiva. As of 2011, Beth Medrash Govoha is run by his grandson, Rabbi Malkiel Kotler, and three of his grandsons-in-law, Rabbis Yerucham Olshin, Yisroel Neuman, and Dovid Schustal. By 2019  the yeshiva had grown into the largest institution of its kind in America with 6,715 students, 2,748 regular and 3,967 in Kollel status. while the surrounding Lakewood community supports a network of more than 100 other yeshivas and approximately  200 synagogues for an Orthodox population estimated at more than 66,000.

Upon the death of his father-in-law, Rabbi Isser Zalman Meltzer, he inherited his father-in-law's position of rosh yeshiva of Etz Chaim Yeshiva of Jerusalem. In an unusual arrangement, he held this position while continuing to live in America, and visiting Jerusalem occasionally. Today, his grandson, Rabbi Zevulun Schwartzman, heads a kollel located at Etz Chaim Yeshiva.

Activism 

Following his arrival in the United States, he joined the presidium of the Vaad Hatzalah, working feverishly to save Rabbis and Yeshiva students who were trapped in Europe. Along with Rabbi Eliezer Silver , Rabbi Avraham Kalmanowitz and others, he worked day and night, using both private and government channels to try and save lives. A committed anti-Zionist, Kotler also helped establish Chinuch Atzmai, the independent religious school system in Israel, and was the chairman of the Moetzes Gedolei HaTorah of Agudath Israel. He chaired the Rabbinical administration board of Torah Umesorah, and was on the presidium of the Agudas HaRabbonim of the U.S. and Canada.

Some of those noted Jewish activists who supported Kotler in his efforts were Irving Bunim, Moses Feuerstein, Stephen Klein and Zev Wolfson

Death 
Kotler died at Columbia-Presbyterian Medical Center in New York City on November 29, 1962. A funeral service at the Congregation Sons of Israel Kalwarier on Manhattan's Lower East Side drew 25,000 mourners, with 200 officers from the New York City Police Department assigned to the event. Kotler was buried in Israel on Har HaMenuchot.

Works 

Shu"t Mishnas R' Aharon
Mishnas Rabbi Aharon on various tractates of the Talmud

Notable students 
 Hakham José Faur (1934–2020), Sepharadi Hakham, teacher and scholar
 Rabbi Yitzchak Abadi (born 1933), posek in Lakewood, New Jersey
 Rabbi Gedalia Schorr (born 1910), Rosh Yeshiva of Torah Vodaas
 Rabbi Shlomo Brevda (1931-2013), maggid and Vilna Gaon scholar
 Rabbi Shlomo Carlebach (musician)
 Rabbi Moshe Heinemann, posek in Baltimore 
 Rabbi Moshe Hillel Hirsch, rosh yeshiva Slabodka Yeshiva in Bnei Brak
 Rabbi Shmuel Kamenetsky, rosh yeshiva Talmudical Academy of Philadelphia
 Rabbi  (1935-2018), chief rabbi of Bnei Brak
 Rabbi Shlomo Leifer of Nadvorna
 Rabbi Shlomo Miller, rosh kollel and posek in Toronto 
 Rabbi Yechiel Perr (born 1935), rosh yeshiva Yeshiva of Far Rockaway
 Rabbi Meir Stern, rosh yeshiva Yeshiva Gedola of Passaic
 Rabbi Elya Svei (1924-2009), rosh yeshiva Talmudical Academy of Philadelphia
 Rabbi Yisroel Taplin, International Date Line scholar
 Rabbi Elyakim Rosenblatt, rosh yeshiva of Yeshiva Kesser Torah
 Philip Berg (1927-2013), dean of the Kabbalah Centre

References

External links 
 With Fire In His Eyes: The Burning Mission of Rav Aharon Kotler
 Rav Aharon Kotler Site
Jewish History Soundbites Podcast on Rabbi Aharon Kotler

1891 births
1962 deaths
People from Svislach
People from Volkovyssky Uyezd
Belarusian Haredi rabbis
Beth Medrash Govoha
American Haredi rabbis
Moetzes Gedolei HaTorah
20th-century Lithuanian rabbis
People from Lakewood Township, New Jersey
Rosh yeshivas
The Holocaust and the United States
Exponents of Jewish law
Rabbis from New Jersey
Anti-Zionist Haredi rabbis
People from the Upper West Side
People from Borough Park, Brooklyn
Burials at Har HaMenuchot
Slabodka yeshiva alumni
20th-century American rabbis